Fenimore Fillmore's Revenge is a 2008 graphic adventure game developed by the Spanish company Revistronic. It is the third game in the Fenimore Fillmore series, following 3 Skulls of the Toltecs (1996) and The Westerner (2003). While its predecessors are cartoonish comedies, Fenimore Fillmore's Revenge features a darker tone and visual look. The game began development around May 2004. Following unofficial reports, it was announced in May 2005.

Fenimore Fillmore's Revenge received a score of 7 out of 10 from MeriStation and a 1.5 out of 5 from Adventure Gamers.

References

External links
Official site (archived)

Fenimore Fillmore's Revenge
Adventure games
Point-and-click adventure games
Revistronic games
Single-player video games
Video game sequels
Video games developed in Spain
Video games set in the United States
Western (genre) video games
Windows games
Windows-only games